Josselin Ouanna (born 14 April 1986) is a retired French tennis player.

Biography
Born in Tours and Guadeloupean origin, he was quickly spotted and integrates INSEP with her friends of "blackteam" Gaël Monfils (of Caribbean origin) and Jo-Wilfried Tsonga (of Congolese origin). He was coached by Jérôme Potier of CNE Roland Garros. Several injuries have slowed his progress between 2005 and 2007.

After another blank year in 2015, he announced his retirement from professional tennis.

Career
In 2004, Ouanna was the runner-up in the Australian Open Boys' Singles. He was defeated by his doubles partner and compatriot Frenchman Gaël Monfils handily. Soon afterwards, he took part his first Challenger tournament in Cherbourg and reached the quarterfinals. In September of the same year, he won his first professional tournament.

In 2007, he reached the quarterfinals at Tunica and Freudenstadt tournaments. He won two Futures tournaments in France in this year.

In 2008, he reached the quarterfinals of four Challenger tournaments early in the season. He played his first Roland Garros as a lucky loser, but lost to Argentina's Juan Martín del Potro in straight sets in the first round. He then lost twice in the quarterfinals of French Challenger tournaments, before winning the Rennes Challenger tournament against Adrian Mannarino. Josselin Ouanna made himself known at the Lyon tournament, where he defeated World #46 Ivan Ljubičić, then Nicolás Lapentti before losing to Gilles Simon. This performance qualifies him for the first Masters France. However, he was eliminated in the pool stage against Julien Benneteau, Gilles Simon and Marc Gicquel.

In April 2009, he won the Challenger tournament in Saint-Brieuc against Adrian Mannarino in three sets.

Ouanna was awarded a wild card for the 2009 French Open, granting him a second Grand Slam appearance. He went through the first round by eliminating the Spaniard Marcel Granollers in five sets. In the second round, he beat one of his childhood heroes, 20th seed and former World #1 Marat Safin, who was playing his last French Open, in five sets. This victory, his first against a Top 30, made him known to the public. Ouanna then lost in the third round to Fernando Gonzalez in three sets.

At the 2009 US Open, he lost to González once again, this time in the second round. After the tournament, he entered the Top 100 for the first time.

At the 2010 French Open, he beat Łukasz Kubot in the first round before losing to Jo-Wilfried Tsonga in the second round.

In 2012, he won the Challenger tournaments of Cherbourg and Saint-Rémy-de-Provence and climbed back up 256 places in the ATP rankings throughout the year, reaching 120th place at the end of the year.

After Nicolas Mahut forfeited his spot for the tournament, Ouanna retrieved a wild-card to take part to the 2013 Australian Open. He lost to Alejandro Falla in the first round, in straight sets.

ATP Challenger and ITF Futures finals

Singles: 19 (9–10)

Doubles: 13 (7–6)

Singles performance timeline

Junior Grand Slam finals

Boys' singles: 1 (1 runner-up)

References

External links
 
 

1986 births
Living people
French male tennis players
French people of Guadeloupean descent
Sportspeople from Suresnes
Sportspeople from Tours, France